Potosi Correctional Center (PCC) is a Missouri Department of Corrections prison located in unincorporated Washington County, Missouri, near Mineral Point. The facility currently houses 800 death row, maximum security and high-risk male inmates.

The facility, which opened in 1989, is a maximum security prison. In 1989 it had about 200 prisoners.

Shortly after the prison's opening, the majority of the non-death row prisoners at Potosi were serving long sentences, such as life imprisonment without parole, or sentences with a 50-year minimum before parole eligibility. A small number had shorter sentences.

Death row
In April 1989 the state transferred its 70 death row inmates from Jefferson City Correctional Center (JCCC, originally Missouri State Penitentiary) to Potosi. U. S. District Court for the Western District of Missouri approved some modifications to the consent decree before the inmates were moved to Potosi. Originally death row prisoners lived in a 92-bed, two wing facility at PCC. The death row inmates had their own special custody levels: minimum custody, medium custody, close custody, and administrative segregation. One wing housed the minimum custody death row inmates, with another wing housing the others. The classification system was intended to award privileges to death row prisoners exhibiting good behavior. After inmates filed legal challenges, administrators began to consider whether to integrate death row prisoners into the non-death row population, because the majority of non-death row the prisoners at PCC had very long sentences and had committed similar crimes to those committed by death row inmates.

MDOC began to stop using the word "death row," believing it to be negative, and began referring to death row prisoners as ""capital punishment" (CP) inmates." For the first time in MDOC history, the state began to allow death row prisoners to leave their housing units, with staff escorts, to eat meals. When no serious incidents occurred, MDOC officials began to use an escort system so death row prisoners could use the gymnasium. The death row prisoners also began to have access to the law library, and death row prisoners were permitted to work in the laundry facility. On January 8, 1991, death row prisoners were fully mainstreamed into the population.

Executions
Death row prisoners are housed at Potosi until being moved to Bonne Terre shortly before their scheduled execution. Since November 23, 2013, 20 executions have been carried out.

Notable Inmates

Current
Charles "Billy" Armentrout – Found guilty of capital murder and originally sentenced to Death Row in the beating death of his grandmother, Inez Notter. In 2006, an appeal resulted in a St. Louis circuit judge reducing his sentence to life in prison. Armentrout's story was the subject of the Netflix docuseries I Am a Killer (Season 2, Episode 7).
Terry Blair – serial killer
Nicholas Godejohn – Convicted of murdering Dee Dee Blanchard.

Former
Zein Isa – Murdered his daughter in an honor killing in 1989 and died in 1997.

Executed
Winford Stokes – Executed May 11, 1990.
Walter Junior Blair – Executed on July 21, 1993, for the murder of Katherine Jo Allen in 1979.
Larry Griffin – Executed June 21, 1995.
Anthony LaRette – Executed November 29, 1995.
Robert Earl O'Neal – Executed December 6, 1995.
Kelvin Malone – Executed January 13, 1999.
Roy Michael Roberts – Executed March 10, 1999.
Stanley Lingar – Executed February 7, 2001.
Amber McLaughlin - Executed January 3, 2023.

References

External links

Official prison website

Prisons in Missouri
Buildings and structures in Washington County, Missouri
Capital punishment in Missouri
1989 establishments in Missouri